Mon is a village in Maharajganj block of Rae Bareli district, Uttar Pradesh, India. As of 2011, its population is 6,262, in 1,056 households. It has 4 primary schools and no healthcare facilities. It is located 4 km from Maharajganj, the block headquarters. The main staple foods are wheat and rice.

The 1961 census recorded Mon as comprising 19 hamlets, with a total population of 2,405 people (1,275 male and 1,130 female), in 457 households and 430 physical houses. The area of the village was given as 3,129 acres, and it had a post office at that point.

The 1981 census recorded Mon as having a population of 3,367 people, in 605 households, and having an area of 1,265.85 hectares.

References

Villages in Raebareli district